Without Warning is an American television film directed by Robert Iscove. It follows a duo of real-life reporters covering  breaking news about three meteor fragments crashing into the Northern Hemisphere. It aired on CBS on October 31, 1994, and is presented as if it were an actual breaking news event, complete with remote reports from reporters. The executive producer was David L. Wolper, who produced a number of mockumentary-style films since the 1960s.

Plot
Broadcast of a murder mystery film starring Loni Anderson, titled Without Warning, is interrupted with a news bulletin of a series of three earthquakes, one of them located in the Thunder Basin National Grassland area of Wyoming. The film resumes but a few moments later is interrupted for good as coverage, led by Sander Vanocur and Dr. Caroline Jaffe, begins of a Halloween night meteor impact on the United States. Additional impacts are reported in southern France and a remote area of China. Lone survivors are found at the Wyoming and France impact sites, a girl and a young man, respectively. The girl had been reported missing from a city hundreds of miles away from the impact. Both survivors are badly burned and their speech is unintelligible.

The three impact sites begin broadcasting an ear-piercing radio signal that cripples aircraft flying within latitudes immediately surrounding the impacts. Another larger object is detected moving towards the North Pole. The United States, despite protests from world leaders and scientists, orders several aircraft to intercept the object before it impacts with the earth and destroy it using nuclear weapons. The destruction of the larger object is successful, though the attacking aircraft are brought down by another radio signal broadcast by the object shortly before its destruction.

A scientist, named Dr. Avram Mandel, who has been studying the impacts, is flown by an F-16 to a U.S. military base where reporters are being briefed on the latest incident. He reveals that his determination is that the impacts were in fact an attempt at first contact by an alien species and that, by destroying the follow-up vehicle, Earth has declared war. Other mysteries occur. At one point, the population of the town of Faith, Wyoming, home to a devoutly religious community, vanishes without a trace.

Dr. Mandel's fears are confirmed when he later reveals that three more objects, each two miles wide, will soon impact Washington, D.C., Moscow, and Beijing - the capital cities of the only three nations capable of first-strike nuclear warfare. The survivors of the initial impacts are identified as Jean-Paul Chounard and Kimberly Hastings. They succumb to their wounds and die. Nuclear weapons are launched to intercept the three incoming objects, which are successfully destroyed. Scientists finally decipher Chounard and Hastings' speech. They are each speaking a fragment of a message. When combined, the message appears to be a recital of the message from the U.N. Secretary General that had been included on a special recording housed aboard Voyager 2.

Moments later, astronomers detect hundreds more asteroids, all heading towards Earth. As a stunned Vanocur and Jaffe react to reports of cities and entire countries being destroyed worldwide, Vanocur solemnly quotes from William Shakespeare; "The fault, dear Brutus, lies not in our stars, but in ourselves" as a rumble is heard and the picture cuts to static.

Cast
 Sander Vanocur as Himself
 Jane Kaczmarek as Dr. Caroline Jaffe
 Bree Walker as Herself 
 Dwier Brown as Matt Jensen
 Brian McNamara as Mike Curtis
 James Morrison as Paul Whitaker
 Ashley Peldon as Kimberly Hastings
 James Handy as Dr. Norbert Hazelton
 Kario Salem as Dr. Avram Mandel
 Spencer Garrett as Paul Collingwood
 Gina Hecht as Barbara Shiller
 John de Lancie as Barry Steinbrenner
 Patty Toy as Denise Wong
 Dennis Lipscomb as Dr. Robert Pearlman
 Ron Canada as Terrence Freeman
 Victor Wilson as Mark Manetti
 John M. Jackson as Dale Powell
 Ernie Anastos as Himself
 Phillip Baker Hall as Dr. Kurt Lowden
 Jim Pirri as Robert Marino
 Alan Scarfe as General Lucian Alexander
 Cynthia Allison as Herself
 Arthur C. Clarke as Himself
 Sandy Hill as Herself
 Michelle Holden as Herself
 Mario Machado as Himself
 Warren Olney as Himself
 Saida Pagan as Herself
 Richard Saxton as Himself
 Debra Snell as Herself

Co-starring
 Randy Crowder as Deputy Anson Peters
 Frank Bruynbroek as Jean-Paul Chounard
 Diana Frank as Sylvie Chounard
 Marnie McPhail as Donna Hastings
 Sherri Paysinger as Pamela Barnes
 Robert Peters as Dwayne Haskell
 Lou Beatty Jr. as Dr. Jonas Tremblay
 John DeMita as Major Powers
 Tyler Cole Malinger as Tyler O'Neal
 Marnie Mosiman as Annie O'Neal
 Armand Schultz as David Case

Production
The film employed "accelerated time" (i.e. events said to have taken place an hour apart actually take place a few minutes apart), among other storytelling devices to make it clear to viewers paying attention that it was not real; including the mention of the year's G7 Summit, which had already come and gone three months before the film released. This, combined with the casting of Jane Kaczmarek, a recognizable actress, as well as several other well-known performers in secondary roles (Star Trek: The Next Generation guest star John de Lancie as a reporter), was expected to alleviate any concerns that the story being shown was actually happening. Ron Canada, who appeared in the film as a science author being interviewed by Sander Vanocur, had previously worked as a television news reporter for stations in Baltimore and Washington, D.C. during the 1970s before becoming an actor.  However, the casting of noted (albeit retired) news anchor Vanocur and noted journalist Bree Walker (who had previously anchored for Los Angeles CBS O&O station KCBS-TV) in major roles portraying themselves, plus a faux interview with noted author Arthur C. Clarke, still left some viewers wondering.

Broadcast
During the film's broadcast, CBS had warnings during the commercial breaks stating that the film was completely fictional, and that the events were not actually happening. Some CBS affiliates, such as KHOU in Houston, had similar warnings in the form of a news ticker "crawl" during the broadcast. The producers used actual CBS News graphics to help accentuate the feeling that it was real (though they used a different network logo, a sphere within an outline of a TV screen), however, leading to at least one uproar over the events.  In Fort Smith, Arkansas, the CBS affiliate (KFSM-TV) reported that they had received dozens of calls regarding the incident and whether it was actually happening.  The area's ABC, Fox, and NBC affiliates (respectively KHBS, KPBI and KPOM-TV) were also flooded with complaints, asking them why they were not covering this event at the same time that CBS was covering it.  In several other markets, including Detroit, Michigan, and San Diego, California, the local CBS affiliates (respectively, WJBK, which would switch to Fox six weeks later, and KFMB-TV) refused to air this TV movie.

Some accused CBS of being irresponsible in showing the movie during the primetime hours, when some children were still out trick-or-treating (indeed, the film explicitly takes place on Oct. 31, with trick or treaters featured in several news reports within), but very few occasions have happened since Orson Welles' 1938 The War of the Worlds radio broadcast that so many people have been taken in by a production such as Without Warning. The film borrowed one of the locations from Welles' broadcast. Welles used the village of Grover's Mill, New Jersey, as the first landing site of the martians in his tale. Without Warning uses the fictional town of Grover's Mill, Wyoming, as an obvious homage to Welles' broadcast, and the original broadcast was preceded by a brief prologue referencing the War of the Worlds broadcast, with the narrator reiterating that the film about to be shown was fiction and presented in the same spirit.

Other television productions that simulate devastating crises in a documentary format predate Without Warning.  Special Bulletin featured a simulated newscast reporting on a nuclear terrorism incident in Charleston, South Carolina, and Countdown to Looking Glass, a Canadian production, combined simulated news footage with behind-the-scenes dramatics to tell the story of how a network covers the outbreak of a nuclear war. World War III is a German television drama that depicts in documentary format the events immediately preceding a global thermonuclear showdown.  Both Ghostwatch and Alternative 3 were British faux documentaries that caused hysteria amongst viewers. Alternative 3 was broadcast in 1977 but to this day some conspiracy theorists insist the story was real.

Other releases and home media
The film was released on DVD on July 8, 2003, nearly nine years after its initial, and only, showing on CBS. However, it has since been shown outside the United States, such as the United Kingdom where it aired on Sci-Fi, minus the commercial break warnings.

See also
 Alternative 3 (1977)
 Special Bulletin (1983)
 Countdown to Looking Glass (1984)
 Ghostwatch (1992)
 World War III (1998)

References

External links

1994 television films
1994 films
American docufiction films
1990s disaster films
1994 science fiction films
American disaster films
American science fiction television films
Disaster television films
Films about impact events
CBS network films
The Wolper Organization films
Films directed by Robert Iscove
Films scored by Craig Safan
Films set in Beijing
Films set in Washington, D.C.
Films set in Wyoming
Films set in France
Films set in Houston
Films set in Moscow
1990s American films
Television controversies in the United States